Vendredi soir (Friday Night) is a 2002 drama film directed by Claire Denis. The screenplay was written by Claire Denis and Emmanuèle Bernheim, based upon Bernheim's novel of the same name. The film premiered at the 2002 Venice Film Festival.

Plot
The night before moving in with her boyfriend, Laure goes to visit some friends and becomes stuck in traffic due to a Paris transit strike. Inspired by a radio news bulletin which encouraged drivers to car pool and offer rides to strangers, she decides to give a ride to a strange man named Jean she spots in the street and is immediately attracted to him. After cancelling on her friend, the two go for a pizza and then spend the night together in a hotel.

Cast  
 Valérie Lemercier as Laure
 Vincent Lindon as Jean
 Hélène de Saint-Père as Marie
 Hélène Fillières as The tired woman
 Florence Loiret Caille as The pinball girl (billed as Florence Loiret-Caille)
 Grégoire Colin as The young man in parka
 Gilles D'Ambra as Husband of the tired woman
 Micha Lescot as The receptionist
 Gianfranco Poddighe as The hotel manager
 Nordine Barour as The server
 Lionel Goldstein as The buyer
 Didier Woldemard as The driver of the van
 Nicolas Struve as The man of the hanging
 Jérôme Pouly as The second man of the hanging
 Nausicaa Meyer as The woman of the hanging

External links 
 
 

Films directed by Claire Denis
2002 drama films
2002 films
French drama films
Films based on French novels
2000s French-language films
2000s French films